The Tela River or Río Tela is a river that runs through Tela, in Honduras, flowing into the Caribbean Sea. It begins in a marshy area inland and opens out near the sea.

See also 
 List of rivers of Honduras

Rivers of Honduras